The 2002 NCAA Division I men's soccer tournament was the 43rd organized men's college soccer tournament by the National Collegiate Athletic Association, to determine the top college soccer team in the United States. The UCLA Bruins won their fourth national title by defeating the Stanford Cardinal in the championship game, 1–0. The final match was played on December 15, 2002, in University Park, Texas at Gerald J. Ford Stadium on the campus of Southern Methodist University, as were the two semi-finals on December 13. All earlier-round games were played at the home field of the higher seeded team.

Seeded Teams

Bracket

Regional 1

Regional 2

Regional 3

Regional 4

Final Four – Gerald J. Ford Stadium, University Park, Texas

References

NCAA Division I Mens Soccer
NCAA Division I Men's Soccer Tournament seasons
NCAA Division I men's soccer tournament
NCAA Division I men's soccer tournament